

"Gladden" (32 nm) 

 All models support: MMX, SSE, SSE2, SSE3, SSSE3, SSE4.1, SSE4.2, AVX, Enhanced Intel SpeedStep Technology (EIST), Intel 64, XD bit (an NX bit implementation), TXT, Intel VT-x, Intel EPT, Intel VT-d, Hyper-threading, AES-NI.
 All models support uni-processor configurations only.
 Die size:216 mm²
 Steppings: D2

Xeon E3-11xx (uniprocessor)

"Sandy Bridge" (32 nm) 

 All models support: MMX, SSE, SSE2, SSE3, SSSE3, SSE4.1, SSE4.2, AVX, Enhanced Intel SpeedStep Technology (EIST), Intel 64, XD bit (an NX bit implementation), TXT, Intel VT-x, Intel EPT, Intel VT-d, Hyper-threading (except E3-1220 and E3-1225), Turbo Boost, AES-NI, Smart Cache.
 All models support uni-processor configurations only.
 Intel HD Graphics P3000 uses drivers that are optimized and certified for professional applications, similar to Nvidia Quadro and AMD FirePro products.
 Die size: D2: 216 mm², Q0: 131 mm²
 Steppings: D2, Q0

Xeon E3-12xx (uniprocessor)

"Sandy Bridge-EN" (32 nm) Entry 
 Based on Sandy Bridge-E CPU.
 All models support: MMX, SSE, SSE2, SSE3, SSSE3, SSE4.1, SSE4.2, AVX, Enhanced Intel SpeedStep Technology (EIST), Intel 64, XD bit (an NX bit implementation), TXT, Intel VT-x, Intel EPT, Intel VT-d, Intel VT-c, Intel x8 SDDC, Hyper-threading (except E5-2403 and E5-2407), Turbo Boost (except E5-1428L, E5-2403 and E5-2407), AES-NI, Smart Cache.

Xeon E5-14xx (uniprocessor)

Xeon E5-24xx (dual-processor)

"Sandy Bridge-EP" (32 nm) Efficient Performance 

 Based on Sandy Bridge microarchitecture.
 All models support: MMX, SSE, SSE2, SSE3, SSSE3, SSE4.1, SSE4.2, AVX, Enhanced Intel SpeedStep Technology (EIST), Intel 64, XD bit (an NX bit implementation), TXT, Intel VT-x, Intel EPT, Intel VT-d, Intel VT-c, Intel x8 SDDC, Hyper-threading (except E5-1603, E5-1607, E5-2603, E5-2609 and E5-4617), Turbo Boost (except E5-1603, E5-1607, E5-2603, E5-2609, E5-4603 and E5-4607), AES-NI, Smart Cache.

Xeon E5-16xx (uniprocessor)

Xeon E5-26xx (dual-processor)

Xeon E5-46xx (quad-processor)

References 

Intel Xeon (Sandy Bridge)